The men's individual competition with revolver and pistol was a shooting sports event held as part of the Shooting at the 1920 Summer Olympics programme. It was the fifth appearance of such an event at different distances. The competition was held on 2 August 1920. 31 shooters from 8 nations competed. The event was won by Karl Frederick of the United States, the nation's second consecutive and third overall victory in the event (most of any nation). Defending champion Alfred Lane took bronze, the first man to win multiple medals in the event. Brazil's Afrânio da Costa finished between the two Americans, taking silver.

Background

This was the fifth appearance of what would become standardised as the men's ISSF 50 meter pistol event. The event was held at every Summer Olympics from 1896 to 1920 (except 1904, when no shooting events were held) and from 1936 to 2016; it was open to women from 1968 to 1980. 1896 and 1908 were the only Games in which the distance was not 50 metres; the former used 30 metres and the latter 50 yards.

Of the top ten shooters from the pre-World War I 1912 Games, only the defending gold medalist, Alfred Lane of the United States, returned.

Brazil and Norway each made their debut in the event. Greece and the United States each made their fourth appearance, tied for most of any nation.

Frederick used a Smith & Wesson Perfected Model Third Model. Da Costa used a new Colt .22 pistol that had been loaned to the Brazilian team by the United States team, and ammunition from Alfred Lane.

Competition format

The competition had each shooter fire 60 shots, in 10 series of 6 shots each, at a distance of 50 metres. The target was round, 50 centimetres in diameter, with 10 scoring rings. Scoring for each shot was up to 10 points, in increments of 1 point. The maximum score possible was 600 points. Shooters who had competed in the team event could use their team score in the individual competition.

Pistols with hairspring triggers, allowed in the world championship, continued to be banned.

Records

Prior to this competition, the existing world and Olympic records were as follows.

No new world or Olympic records were set during the competition.

Schedule

Results

The maximum score was 600.

References

External links
 Official Report
 

Shooting at the 1920 Summer Olympics
Men's 1920